The Marshall Thundering Herd football team is an intercollegiate varsity sports program of Marshall University. The team represents the university as a member of the Sun Belt Conference East Division of the National Collegiate Athletic Association, playing at the NCAA Division I Football Bowl Subdivision level.

Marshall plays at Joan C. Edwards Stadium, which seats 38,227 and is expandable to 55,000. At the end of the 2021 football season, Marshall had a 177–42 record at Joan C. Edwards Stadium for a winning percentage of .808. The stadium opened in 1991 as Marshall University Stadium with a crowd of 33,116 for a 24–23 win over New Hampshire. On September 10, 2010, Marshall played the in-state rival West Virginia Mountaineers in Huntington in front of a record crowd of 41,382. Joan C. Edwards Stadium is one of two Division I stadiums named for a woman. The playing field is named James F. Edwards Field after Joan Edwards' husband, who was a businessman and philanthropist.

History

Early history (1895–1987)

Boyd Chambers was Marshall's head football coach from 1909 to 1916. He is best known for calling the "Tower Play", where one receiver lifted another up on his shoulders to complete a pass, during the 1915 season.

Rick Tolley era (1969–1970)
Rick Tolley was Marshall's head football coach for two seasons, coming to Marshall from his post as defensive line coach for Wake Forest and posting records of 3–7 and 3–6. Tolley was killed on November 14, 1970, in a plane crash which killed all 75 passengers, including 37 players, five coaches, administrators, family, friends, and the Southern Airways five-person crew, as it returned to West Virginia after a game against East Carolina.

Jack Lengyel era (1971–1974)
Marshall athletic director, Joe McMullen, hired Jack Lengyel to be head coach in 1971. To rebuild following the plane crash, Lengyel recruited athletes from the baseball and basketball teams. Lengyel's record as Marshall's head coach was 9–33.

Frank Ellwood era (1975–1978)
Marshall hired Ohio University assistant Frank Ellwood, a Dover, Ohio, native who led the program for four seasons. The team went 2-9 during his first season and 5-6 during the 1976 campaign, a year in which the Thundering Herd upset 20th-ranked Miami (Ohio) on Sept. 12, 1976 at Fairfield Stadium in Huntington. The Herd had not defeated Miami since 1939. Marshall finished 2-9 and 1-10 in 1977 and 1978, respectively, failing to win a Southern Conference game in either season.

Sonny Randle era (1979–1983)
Sonny Randle became head coach following the 1978 season. Randle had been the head coach at East Carolina and Virginia. He went 12-42-1 during his five seasons in Huntington, which included a 5-26-1 record in Southern Conference play. Randle mentored Marshall Athletics Hall of Famer Carl Lee during his tenure.

Jim Donnan era (1990–1995)
Led by head coach Jim Donnan, who came to Marshall from his post as offensive coordinator at Oklahoma, Marshall won the Division I-AA national championship in 1992 over Youngstown State (31–28) and was national runner-up in 1991, 1993 and 1995. Marshall set an I-AA record with five consecutive seasons making the semifinals of the I-AA playoffs from 1991 to 1996. Donnan was named NCAA Division I-AA Coach of the Year twice during his tenure at Marshall and resigned after the 1995 season to accept the head football coach position at Georgia.

Bob Pruett era (1996–2004)

Bob Pruett left his post as defensive coordinator at Florida to become head football coach at Marshall, where he served from 1996 to 2004. During his tenure at Marshall, the Thundering Herd compiled a record of 94–23, featured two undefeated seasons, won six conference championships, won five of seven bowl games, and captured the I-AA National Championship in 1996. Marshall moved to Division I-A and the Mid-American Conference in all sports in 1997. The 1996 team, ranked No. 1 all season, was 15–0 and won each game by more than two touchdowns. The 1996 team included future NFL players Chad Pennington, Randy Moss, John Wade, Chris Hanson, Eric Kresser, Doug Chapman. Marshall won the MAC title five of its eight seasons (1997-2000, 2002) and were runners up in 2001 in the conference before moving to Conference USA in 2005.

Since moving back to Division I-A, Marshall has finished in the Top 25 four times, in 1999, 2001, 2002 and 2014. From 1997-2000, Marshall appeared in the Motor City Bowl, losing in 1997 to Ole Miss before winning the next three bowl games against Louisville, BYU and Cincinnati. Marshall beat East Carolina 64-61 a double-overtime game in the 2001 GMAC Bowl in Mobile, Alabama. Marshall trailed 38–8 at halftime before rallying behind five Byron Leftwich touchdown passes. Marshall lost 32–14 to Cincinnati in the 2004 Plains Capital Fort Worth Bowl at Amon G. Carter Stadium in Pruett's final game as head coach before his retirement.

Mark Snyder era (2005–2009)

Former Marshall football player Mark Snyder became head football coach, leaving his position as defensive coordinator for Ohio State. Snyder coached Ahmad Bradshaw, Lee Smith, Vinny Curry, Albert McClellan and Cody Slate during his time as head coach at Marshall. Snyder's best season was 6–6 in 2009. He resigned after five seasons that included one bowl berth, the 2009 Little Caesar's Pizza Bowl.

Doc Holliday era (2010–2020)
On December 17, 2009, Doc Holliday, an assistant coach at West Virginia University, became Marshall's head coach after signing a five-year contract at $600,000 per season. Holliday led Marshall to a 10–4 season in 2013, capped with a victory in the Military Bowl. In the 2014 season, he led the team to a 13–1 season, winning the school's first C-USA Championship and the inaugural Boca Raton Bowl against Northern Illinois 52–23. In 2015, Holliday led the Herd to their first victory over a Big Ten school after beating the Purdue Boilermakers en route to a 10–3 season, including a win in the 2015 St. Petersburg Bowl. In 2020, Holliday led Marshall to a 7–0 start and a No. 15 Associated Press ranking. A three-game losing streak followed and the team finished 7–3. Marshall won the Conference USA East Division title, before losing to the University of Alabama at Birmingham in the 2020 Conference USA Championship game. Holliday was named Coach of the Year in 2020 by Conference USA. In January 2021, Doc Holliday's contract was not extended.

Charles Huff era (2021–present)
On January 17, 2021, Marshall hired Alabama running backs coach Charles Huff as its head coach. In his first season, Huff led Marshall to a 7–6 record. Marshall lost to the No. 23-ranked Louisiana Ragin' Cajuns 36–21 in the 2021 New Orleans Bowl. The school officially joined the Sun Belt conference in June 2022 and the football team will compete in the conference during the 2022 season. On September 10, 2022, Huff led Marshall to their second all-time victory over a top-10 opponent after defeating the No. 8-ranked Notre Dame Fighting Irish 26–21 at Notre Dame Stadium. Huff earned his first bowl win as a head coach in the 2022 Myrtle Beach Bowl against the UConn Huskies 28–14.

Conference affiliations
 Independent (1895–1925, 1952–1953, 1969–1976)
 West Virginia Athletic Conference (1925–1932)
 Buckeye Conference (1933–1938)
 WVIAC (non-competing member, membership in regards to school being accredited college)  (1939–1947)
 Ohio Valley Conference (1948–1951)
 Mid-American Conference (1954–1968, 1997–2004)
 Southern Conference (1977–1996)
 Conference USA (2005–2021)
 Sun Belt Conference (2022–present)

Championships

National championships
Marshall has won two NCAA Division I-AA national championships.

Conference championships
Marshall has won 13 conference championships, 12 outright and one shared.

† Co-champions

Division championships
Marshall has nine division championships.

† Co-champions

Bowl games 

Marshall has been invited to play in 19 bowl games, compiling a record of 13–6 through the 2022 season. The Tangerine Bowl was unsanctioned by the NCAA until 1968. As such, the 1948 appearance in the game is not included in the official NCAA bowl listing for Marshall.

Head coaches

Division I-AA playoff results
Marshall has appeared in the I-AA playoffs eight times, compiling a record 23–6. They are two-time I-AA National Champions and four-time national runners-up.

Rivalries

Appalachian State

Known colloquially as The Old Mountain Feud, the rivalry with Appalachian State was played annually 1977-1996. The rivalry resumed annual play in the 2020 season and is set to continue as Marshall joins Appalachian State in the Sun Belt Conference East Division in 2022. The significance of the rivalry is that both schools are public universities in the Appalachian mountains, dominant in FCS and FBS Group of Five football, recruit the same players out of the same regions, and have a national reputation that exceeds most peer football programs of their size. An altercation at Kidd Brewer Stadium in 2021 made national news after a group of Mountaineer supporters taunted Marshall players on their way to the locker room and a Marshall player spat at the fans.  Appalachian State leads the all-time series, 15-9.

Ohio

Marshall’s regional rival is Ohio University. Both schools compete against one another in the Battle for the Bell, with a traveling bell trophy as the prize for the victor. Both schools also played in the same MAC Conference for a number of years until Marshall joined Conference USA in 2005 - causing the annual rivalry game to go on hiatus. The regularly scheduled series resumed between the two schools in 2010. The rivalry was renewed in 2009 when the Herd and Bobcats faced off in the 2009 Little Caesars Pizza Bowl, which the Herd won 21–17. Ohio leads the all-time series over Marshall, however the Thundering Herd have won 10 of 15 meetings since rejoining the FBS in 1997. The six-year series contract between the two schools ran out following the 2015 season. The series has since been renewed, as both schools are set to play one another in a future matchup in 2027. Ohio leads the series 33–21–6 through the 2021 season.

West Virginia

Marshall played West Virginia in the annual Friends of Coal Bowl until 2012. Marshall and WVU first played in 1911, but it wasn't until 2006 before the two schools from the "Mountain State" faced off annually for the Governor's Cup. Some believe the rivalry began due to political pressure from the state government. The two last played in 2012, and there are no immediate plans to renew the rivalry. West Virginia holds a 12–0 lead in the series as of 2012.

East Carolina

Marshall and East Carolina have a "friendly" rivalry with one another. They are emotionally bonded by the tragic plane crash on November 14, 1970. The Thundering Herd were coming back from Greenville, North Carolina after a 17–14 loss to the Pirates when their plane crashed near Ceredo, West Virginia. The teams have been bonded ever since.

One of Marshall and ECU's most memorable games was the 2001 GMAC Bowl as they combined for a bowl record, 125 points, as Marshall overcame a 30-point deficit to beat East Carolina 64–61 in double overtime. After Marshall defeated East Carolina in 2013, it marked ECU's last conference match-up as a member of Conference USA. On April 3, 2014, both schools announced that the two teams will meet again for a home and home seridatees in 2020 and 2021. East Carolina was supposed to host Marshall at Dowdy–Ficklen Stadium in Greenville, NC on September 5, 2020, but was cancelled due to the COVID-19 pandemic. Marshall will host at Joan C. Edwards Stadium in Huntington, West Virginia on September 11, 2021 before travelling to Greenville on September 9, 2023 and host again on September 13, 2025.

ECU was 6–3 against the Herd from 2005 to 2013 when both schools were in Conference USA. East Carolina leads the series 11–5.

Western Kentucky
Marshall and WKU developed a feuding rivalry as members of Conference USA. In 2014, WKU's first season as a member of CUSA, both teams played in the final regular season game in Huntington, WV. Marshall entered the game ranked 24th in the country and undefeated on the season. The game was a high scoring shootout battle between veteran QB's from each team: Brandon Doughty for WKU and Rakeem Cato for Marshall. The game went into overtime, where WKU pulled off the upset 67-66, and dashed Marshall's chances at both an undefeated season and a potential NY6 bowl bid. The following season, both schools met once again tied for first in the CUSA East Division. The Hilltoppers prevailed once again, led by QB Brandon Doughty who threw for 5 TDs and beat Marshall by a final score 49-28. In 2016, WKU defeated Marshall in Huntington, 60-6. In subsequent years, from 2017-2020, Marshall would retake dominance in the series, winning 4 straight years against WKU, including a notable game in 2019 where Marshall kicker Justin Rohrwasser kicked a last second 53 yard field goal secure Marshall's victory 26-23. In 2021, the final game between both teams as members of CUSA, the Hilltoppers would win behind the arm of Bailey Zappe and advance again to the Conference USA title game. As conference members the rivalry was deadlocked at 4-4, however Marshall holds the edge on the all time series at 8-5. Fans from both universities, and even commentators during live broadcasts of the games, have unofficially dubbed the rivalry “The Moonshine Throwdown”.  In 2022, Marshall moved to the Sun Belt Conference, thus ending the series between the two schools for the immediate future.

Home venues 
 Fairfield Stadium (1927–1990)
 Joan C. Edwards Stadium (1991–present)

Traditions

"We Are... Marshall" Chant 
“We Are…Marshall” has been around since football games in the 1980s at the university’s old Fairfield Stadium, where the stadium scoreboard would light up with alternating arrows to indicate which side of the crowd should lead the cheer. Since then, “We Are…Marshall” has become the rallying cry for a resilient school and community.

Thunder Walk 
The football team’s pre-game walk through the tailgaters at the Joan C. Edwards Stadium has become a ritual. Fans line both sides of the route to cheer the players and coaches as they make their way to the stadium for each home game.

"Sons of Marshall" Fight Song 
When the 300-member strong Marching Thunder enters the Joan C. Edwards Stadium playing the school’s official fight song, the hearts of sons and daughters of Marshall University swell with pride. The march was written in 1935 by alumnus Ralph A. Williams.

Memorial '75' Game  
Each season, the home game closest to the date November 14th is designated as the Memorial '75' or Tribute Game; a game in which Marshall wears special helmets and uniforms in tribute to the victims of the 1970 Marshall football team plane crash. It began under former Marshall head coach "Doc" Holiday, during the 2013 and 2014 seasons, which saw Marshall wear their traditional white M helmets with a special '75' decal on one side of the helmet, representing the 75 lives lost. 2015 marked the 45th anniversary of the 1970 tragedy - to which Marshall unveiled black jerseys for the first time in program history against FIU on 11/14/15. In 2022, Marshall revealed a new black helmet and wore entirely all-black uniforms for the tribute game against Appalachian State.

Top 25 finishes

I-AA Polls

Sources:

1-A/FBS Polls

Sources:

Individual honors

Award winners 

AFCA Coaches' Choice National Player of the Year
Mike Barber – 1988
Walter Payton Award
Michael Payton – 1992
Fred Biletnikoff Award
Randy Moss-1997

Sammy Baugh Trophy
Chad Pennington – 1999
William V. Campbell Trophy
Chad Pennington – 1999

All-Americans
Sources:

Rasheen Ali (2021)
Mike Barber (1987, 1988)
Mike Bartrum (1992)
Rogers Beckett (1999)
Troy Brown (1991, 1992)
B. J. Cohen (1995, 1996)
Melvin Cunningham (1995, 1996)
Josh Davis (2001)
Sean Doctor (1987, 1988)
Johnathan Goddard (2004)
Chris Hanson (1996)
Eric Kresser (1996)
Byron Leftwich (2001, 2002)
Billy Lyon (1994, 1995, 1996)
Albert McClellan (2005, 2006)
Randy Moss (1996, 1997)
Michael Payton (1991, 1992)
Chad Pennington (1998, 1999)
Steve Sciullo (2002)
Cody Slate (2006)
Mark Snyder (1987)
Darius Watts (2001, 2002)
Tyler Williams (2012)

Hall of Fame

College football
Marshall has five players and one coach in the College Football Hall of Fame.
Harry "Cy" Young starred in football and baseball at Marshall College (University status in 1961) from 1910 to 1912. Young then left Marshall, and was a two-sport All-American at Washington & Lee. He is a member of the W&L HOF, MU HOF, WV Sportswriters HOF and Virginia Sports HOF besides the College FB HOF.
Jackie Hunt (1939–41) set a national scoring record in 1940 with 27 touchdowns in a ten-game season. He rushed for nearly 4,000 yards for Thundering Herd, a hometown star for the Huntington High Pony Express before joining Marshall. He was drafted by the Chicago Bears and was a two-time All-American, playing in the Blue-Gray Game following his career.
 Mike Barber (1985–88) was a record-setting receiver for Marshall who helped lead the Herd to its first I-AA title game in 1987 and its first Southern Conference title in 1988. He still holds the receiving yardage record at MU with over 4,200 yards and was a two-time All-American before he was drafted by the San Francisco 49ers in the fourth round in 1989. Barber also played for the Arizona Cardinals and Cincinnati Bengals.
Troy Brown (1991–92) considered the single-most dangerous scoring threat in all of Division I-AA during his two seasons in Huntington, few can match the heralded career of Marshall's record-breaking wide receiver. A dual threat on the playing field, Brown's elusive nature as a receiver and kick returner led the Thundering Herd to back-to-back trips to the Division I- AA (now FCS) National Championship game, garnering the NCAA title in 1992. He caught 139 receptions for 2,746 yards and 24 touchdowns in his career en route to earning First Team All-America honors his senior year. Brown went on to play 14 years in the NFL with the New England Patriots, where he became the franchise's all-time leading receiver and won three Super Bowls with the team.
Michael Payton (1989-1992) was the starting quarterback for the Thundering Herd, leading the team to its first FCS national championship in 1992.  Peyton was the 1992 winner of the Walter Payton Award and was a consensus First-Team All-American.
Jim Donnan (1990–1995) the only coach representing Marshall in the College Football Hall of Fame. Donnan spent six seasons with Marshall and posted a 64–21 record. He led the Thundering Herd to four Division I-AA National Championship games, winning the 1992 national title. In 1994, the Thundering Herd won the Southern Conference Championship. His 15–4 playoff record ranks second best in NCAA FCS history. He was named Division I- AA Coach of the Year in 1992 and 1995.

Pro football
 Frank Gatski, C, 1985. Gatski is the only Marshall player to have his jersey number retired and was Marshall's first player in the Professional Football Hall of Fame. The university retired Gatski's No. 72 during a halftime ceremony at Joan C. Edwards Stadium on October 15, 2005. Gatski died a month later, at age 86. During his career with the Cleveland Browns (1946–56) and the Detroit Lions (1957) he won eight championships in 11 title game appearances. Cleveland won the All-American Football Conference four straight years, going 14–0 in 1948, before joining the NFL. The Browns won NFL titles in 1950, 1954 and 1955 and were runners-up in 1951, 1952 and 1953. Gatski's Lions beat the Browns for his final title in 1957. The 31st Street Bridge, connecting Huntington to Proctorville, Ohio, is also named in Gatski's honor, joining U.S. Senator Robert Byrd (formerly the Sixth St. Bridge) and Congressman Nick Rahall (the former 17th St. Bridge) among three structures stretching across the Ohio River from West Virginia to Ohio.
 Randy Moss, WR, 2018. Moss is the second player in the Professional Football Hall of Fame to have been a member of the Thundering Herd. In a career that spanned 14 seasons with the Minnesota Vikings, Oakland Raiders, New England Patriots, Tennessee Titans, and the San Francisco 49ers, Moss amassed the fourth-most receiving yards (15,292) and second-most receiving touchdowns (156) in NFL history. Moss appeared in two Super Bowls (losing both); Super Bowl XLII with the Patriots and Super Bowl XLVII with the 49ers. As of the end of the 2017 NFL season, Moss still holds the NFL record for 17 receiving touchdowns as a rookie (1998), when he also won the AP Offensive Rookie of the Year award, and most receiving touchdowns in a season (23), set back in 2007. Moss over his career also reached the 1,000-yard receiving mark eight times, was elected to six Pro Bowls (winning the MVP in 1999), made the First-team All-Pro four times, and selected as a member of the NFL 2000s All-Decade Team. In addition to his receiving abilities, Moss additionally accumulated two touchdown passes, one touchdown on a punt return, and an interception in his career.

Marshall University Hall of Fame 
Established in 1984, members from the football team are listed below.

1970 Crash Victims 1990 Honored
Bob Adkins, '39 1984
Mike Barber, '88 1994
Mike Bartrum, '92 2007
Ahmad Bradshaw, '06 2017
Troy Brown, '92 2002
Doug Chapman, '99 2010
George Chaump, 2013
B. J. Cohen, '97 2005
Larry Coyer, '64 1987
Chris Crocker, '02 2013
Melvin Cunningham, '96 2016
Vinny Curry, '12 2022
Josh Davis, '04 2018
Sean Doctor, '88 2000
Jim Donnan, 2008
Carl Fodor, '85 1991
Frank Gatski, '42 1985
John Grace, '99 2010
Len Hellyer, '56 1988
Cam Henderson, '33–55 1984
Eric Ihnat, '90 2017
Dewey Klein, '91 2018
Carl Lee, '82 1995
Byron Leftwich, '02 2007
Jack Lengyel, '71-74 2022
Billy Lyon, '96 2007
Albert McClellan, '09 2020
Giradie Mercer, '99 2019
Randy Moss, '97 2010
Reggie Oliver, '73 1984
Tim Openlander, '96 2015
Chris Parker '95 2000
Chad Pennington, '99 2010
Tony Petersen, '88 1994
Bob Pruett, '65 1999
Steve Sciullo, 02 2020
Charlie Slack, '56 1985
Ed Ulinski, '41 1986
John Wade, '97 2010
Darius Watts, '03 2014
Norm Willey, '49 2003
Jamie Wilson, '96 2019
William "Bill" Richard Winter, '64 1990
Max Yates, '01 2019

Retired numbers

Future non-conference opponents 
Announced schedules as of February 24, 2023.

References

External links

 

 
American football teams established in 1895
1895 establishments in West Virginia